Fear of God is an album by the New Zealand band the Bats, released in 1991. It was their first album to be distributed by Mammoth.

The tracks "The Black and the Blue" and "Boogey Man" were released as singles, and the album peaked at No. 43 in the New Zealand charts.

Critical reception
Trouser Press wrote that "thanks in part to producer Nicholas Sansano (Sonic Youth, Public Enemy), the album dissipates the cloudiness hovering over the Bats' earlier work (which was never an entirely bad thing), while respecting the crisp arrangements and sugary melodic centers." Stereo Review noted the "cute jangly guitars, cute pop hooks, cute rough-hewn vocals."

Track listing

Personnel
Malcolm Grant - drums, percussion
Paul Kean - bass
Robert Scott - guitar, lead vocals, painting (cover)
Kaye Woodward - guitar, vocals

Also credited:
Nick "The Chair" Caiano - guitar
Glenn Fitton - percussion
Alan Starrett - viola, accordion ("Straight Image")
Nick Sansano - percussion [cheap], accordion ("The Looming Past")
Craig McGill - illustration

References

The Bats (New Zealand band) albums
1991 albums
Flying Nun Records albums
Dunedin Sound albums